The Venerable Taung Kalay (Taung Galay) Sayadaw Ashin Paññasãmi (Ashin Pin Nya Tha Mi) (born Saw Phoe Thu on 14 July 1960) is a Karen Theravada Buddhist monk, and also known as a prolific writer and a historian.

Early life
Ven. Taung Ka Lay Sayadaw was born Saw Phoe Thu to Aung Khin and Nan Sein Hla Khin on Thursday, 14 July 1960 (the 7th waning day of Warso in 1322 Myanmar era) in Hlar Ka Myin village in Hpa-an Township, Karen State, Burma.

Shin Paññāsāmī
At the age of 8, he was novitiated on 14 March 1968 (the 7th waxing moon of Tapaung in 1329 Myanmar era), with Sayadaw Badanda Thuriya of Hlar Ka Myin Monastery as the preceptor and his parents as the organizer and supporter of the ordination ceremony.

At the age of twenty-one, on 21 March 1981 (the 1st waxing moon of Tapaung in 1342 Myanmar era), the novice Pinnyathami was fully ordained as a Buddhist monk; his preceptor was Bhaddanda Thuzarta, the Shwebo Kyaung Sayadaw in Hpa-An, and his parents supporting the ordination.

Monkhood and awards
The pursuit of monastic education by Sayadaw Ashin Pin Nya Tha Mi has been remarkable. He has passed many religious exams, some with honors: The Abhidharma exam, the Pali Pahtamapyan Examinations, the Thuthama Saya exam, the Thaddhama Parla exam, the Pidhakaya Paraku exam, Vinaya exam, and exam for a comparative study of world religions. In addition to these accomplishments, during 1989–1990, he informally learned Sanskrit and Pali from Dr. Zagara Abivansa, the Raza Giri Sayadaw of Sampurnanand Sanskrit Vishwavidyalaya and Nava Nalanda Mahavihara. Through continuous learning, Sayadaw's relentless efforts to seek wisdom have earned him an Hon. Doctor of Oriental Learning (Ph.D.) on history from Indian Institute of Oriental Heritage, Kolkata, India in 2013. In November 2022, Sayadaw was awarded the honour of Thiri Pyanchi by the government of Myanmar.

Publications
The Venerable Sayadaw is an author. Under the pen name of Aee Koe (အဲးခိုး), he has been regularly writing articles on The Myanmar Herald Journal (မြန်မာသံတော်ဆင့်) and under the pen name of Tawhmi Rahan, he has written many books, articles, and poems on different topics ranging from Buddhist teachings, literature and culture, children stories to environment, politics, and peace. The Sayadaw of Maenu Oak Kyaung monastery, The Noble Truth of Buddha, The Virtues of Buddha and Its Power, Cherish the Life of Others, Children's Stories of Animals and The Battlefield in Myanmar are on the list of over 100 books that have been written and published by the Venerable Sayadaw, Ashin Pin Nya Tha Mi. He had also been part of the team that compiled the Pwo Kayin-English-Myanmar Dictionary. 
 (သတိပဠာန်လေးပါးတရားတော်) - Four Aspects of Satipatthana
 (ကလေးများအတွက်မြတ်ဗုဒ္ဓဝိပါတ်တော်၁၂ပါး) - 12 Buddhha's Vipāka Stories for Children
 (အရှေ့ပိုးကရင်အမျိုးသားချည်ဖြူဖွဲ့မင်္ဂလာ(ပိုးကရင်ဘာသာ)) - White Thread Wrist Tying Culture of East Pwo Karen
 (မယ်နုအုတ်ကျောင်းဆရာတော်) - The Monk of Me Nu Ok Kyaung (Me Nu's Brick Monastery) 
 (အရိယသစ္စဒဿန) 
 (ကော့ဂွန်းဂူသမိုင်း) - The History of Kawtgon Cave 
 (ဗုဒ္ဓဂုဏ်တော်နှင့်ကိုယ်တွေ့ဖြစ်ရပ်ဆန်းများ) 
 (ကလေးများအတွက်ဟိတောပဒေသ) 
 (တောလေးဆယ်) 
 (ပဠာန်းပါဠိတော်ဖတ်နည်းကျက်မှတ်နည်း) 
 (ဇယစက္ကအောင်မြေ(၁၀၀၀)(သမိုင်းပြစာတမ်း)) 
 (သူ့အသက်ကိုချစ်ပါလေ) 
 (ဖောင်တော်ဦးစေတီတော်သမိုင်းနှင့်သုဓနဝတ္ထု)
 (ပဒုံဂူသမိုင်း) 
 (ပဠာန်းဆရာတော်အရှင်ဝဇီရဗုဒ္ဓီဘိဝံသ၏ထေရုပ္ပတ္ထိ)
 (ဘားအံ့မြို့သေဠမာရ်အောင်ဘုရားကြီးသမိုင်း)
 (ဒေါသကိုထိန်းဘေးရန်ငြိမ်း)
 (မဇျ္စိမဒေသခရီး)
 (ကေလာသတောင်ခြေမှာ)
 (ကလေးများအတွက်လောကနီတိ)
 (ကလေးများအတွက်စာဏကျနီတိ)
 (ဆရာတော်ဦးဗုဒ်စကား)
 (ဆရာတော်ဦးသီလစကား)
 Bodh Gaya a kyaung thi kaung sa yar (ဗုဒ္ဓဂယာအကြောင်းသိကောင်းစရာ(ဗုဒ္ဓစာပေဆုဒုတိယ)) - Bodh Gaya (2001)
 (မြတ်ဗုဒ္ဓသာသနာတော်ခေတ်နှင့်သမိုင်းအမြင်(ဗုဒ္ဓစာပေဆုပထမ))
 (ယောဂီသူမြတ်ကျင့်အပ်လှ)
 (မြစ်ကူးလှေ)
 (စံရိပ်ငြိမ်တရားများ)
 (စန္ဒကူးရနံ့များ)
 (စန္ဒန၏စာပန်းအိမ်)
 (တောမှီရဟန်း၏စာစုခရီး)
 (ဓမ္မာသောက၏ဓမ္မအောင်ပွဲ(ပြဇာတ်))
 (အေးငြိမ်းချမ်းသာမင်္ဂလာ)
 (ကရင်ပြည်နယ်မေတ္တာခရီး)
 (ကလေးများအတွက်မြင့်မြတ်သောမိခင်(ကဗျာ))
 (အမှတ်တရဗုဒ္ဓဂါယာ)
 (၁၂လရာသီအရှေ့ပိုးကရင်ယဥ်ကျေးမှု)
 (ကုသိနာရုံပိဋကတ်တော်နှင့်သုတေသနစာတမ်း)
 (စတုရာရက္ခစာတမ်း)
 (မြန်မာသူအိမ်ရှင်မ) - Myanmar Housewife
 (ဓမ္မသာကစ္ဆာမင်္ဂလာ)
 (ကရင့်စာဆိုများ)
 (အိန္ဒိယမှဘာသာများ)
 (ရတနာကိုရှာဖွေခြင်း)
 (ငှက်မင်း၏စကားသံ) - The Voice of Bird King
 (ခရီးလမ်း) - The Journey 
 (မောရိယ၏ဓမ္မသာရထိ)
 (ရှုဖွယ်ဗုဒ္ဓနေရာ)
 (တိုင်းရင်းသားကရင်လူမျိုးများ) - Ethnic Karen People
 (အိုးမလုပ်ခင်အိုးဖုတ်စဥ်ဝယ်)
 (ကရင်+မြန်မာ+အင်္ဂလိပ်အဘိဓါန်)
 (ကရင်တို့ဒေသဗုဒ္ဓသာသနာ)
 (မဂ်ချမ်းသာ)
 (လောကနီတိ(ကရင်ဘာသာ))
 (ဓမ္မစက္တပဝတ္ထနသုတ္တန်(ကရင်ဘာသာ))
 (ကမ္မဝါစာ(ကရင်ဘာသာ))
 (ပန်းကလေးလိုလှပါစေ)
 (ဓမ္မပဒ(ကရင်ဘာသာ))
 (ဓမ္မပဒ(မြန်မာဘာသာ))
 (ဖလီ(ကရင်ဘာသာကဗျာ))
 (ထီ့ဒိုက်ဒါန်(ကရင်ဘာသာကဗျာ))
 (စန္ဒန၏အတ္ထုပတ္တိ)
 (ဓမ္မခရီးသည်) - Dharma Traveller 
 (မေတ္တာဘာဝနာပွားများနည်း)
 (မြန်မာ့နန်းစဥ်ရတနာရှာပုံတော်)
 (တမလွန်ဘဝချမ်းသာမှု) - Afterlife Peace
 (ကော့ဂွန်းဂူတောရခရီး) - Journey to Kawtgon Cave
 (လောကနီတိ(မြန်မာဘာသာ))
 (ဇွဲကပင်တောင်သွားရအောင်) - Let's Go to Mount Zwegabin
 (ရွှေစေတီတောရခရီး)
 (အရှေ့ပိုးကရင်စာပေအညွှန်း)
 (ကံ၏အဆုံးအဖြတ်) - 
 (နောက်ဆုံးဆယ်လအစိုးရ(နိုင်ငံရေးဆောင်းပါးများ))
 (ထုတ်ပယ်ထိုက်သူ)
 (ဝေသာလီသို့သွားရအောင်) - Let's Go to Vaishali
 (ဗုဒ္ဓဘာသာကိုအကျိုးပြုသူများ) 
 (ညှို့ကွင်း)
 (အပြစ်ကိုဘယ်ရေနဲ့ဆေးမလဲ) - Which water do you use to wash your sins? 
 (ဖူကိုယားမား၏သမိုင်းနိဂုံး)
 (ဖလုံလိက်ခေါင်းထိုက်ကရင်စာပေသင်ကြားရေးကောက်နုတ်ချက်)
 (မာရ်မင်း၏ကျော့ကွင်း)
 (ဝေဠုဝန်ဥယျာဥ်သာဝယ်)
 (သားသမီးနှင့်မိဘ) - Offspring and Parents
 (ငြိမ်းချမ်းသောနိုင်ငံတော်မှအပြန်)
 (ပဗ္ဗာဇနိယကမ္မဝါ(ကရင်ဘာသာ))
 (ဝါခေါင်လချည်ဖြူဖွဲ့မင်္ဂလာအကြောင်း(ကရင်ဘာသာ))
 (သစ္စာရှိသောမြန်မာနိုင်ငံမှကရင်လူမျိုးများ)
 (အရှေ့ပိုးကရင်ယဥ်ကျေးမှုနှင့်စာပေ) 
 (ဝေဖန်ပြီးမှယုံပါ) - Criticize before believe
 (နိုးကြားသူအားဘေးမရှိ) - No harm to those who are alert
 (ဘောင်ဘင်မခတ်နှင့်တပည့်)
 (ချမ်းသာစွာအိပ်စက်နိုင်ကြပါစေ) - May you sleep soundly
 (ပိုးကရင်စာပေအခြေခံသဒ္ဒါ(ကရင်+မြန်မာ)) - Pwo Karen Basic Grammar 
 (မြန်မာတို့တစ်နှစ်အတွင်းစစ်တလင်း) - Battlefield in Myanmar in one year (2009); (About Burma History from 1824 to 1948).
 (ပါဋလိပုတ္တဂါမ)
 (သတိပေးပြတိုက်) 
 (ဥာဏ်ဖြင့်ရှု့၍ဆင်ခြေပါ)
 (သရဏံဂုဏ်တရားတော်)
 (ပါရမီဆယ်ပါးနံနက်ခင်းသြဝါဒများ)
 (ဗုဒ္ဓယဥ်ကျေးမှုနေရာများ) 
 (မြန်မာသံတော်ဆင့်တွင်ရေးသားသောဆောင်းပါးများ) - Articles featured in The Myanmar Herald
 (ငြိမ်းချမ်းမှုနှင့်သင့်မြတ်မှု) - Peace and Harmony 
 (ရတနာခရီး) 
 (ရွှေရောင်ပြတောရခရီး)
 Avihiṃsā naing gan yay (အဝိဟိံသာနိုင်ငံရေး) - Avihiṃsā Politics
 (အေးမြသာခေါင်သာမညတောင်) - Peaceful Mount Thamanya
 (ဘဝသံသရာ) - Life Saṃsāra
 (ကျောင်းထိုင်ဆရာတော်လက်စွဲ) - Handbook for Abbot
 (အမြင့်မြတ်ဆုံးအမျိုးသမီး(သို့)အနှိုင်းမဲ့အဖြည့်ခံ)
 (ဓမ္မနို့ရည်ကဗျာစုစည်းမှု)

Community work
The Venerable Sayadaw has also engaged in several other religious and social activities such as preaching the Buddha's sermons, practicing and teaching mediations, renovating pagodas and taking the roles of National Sangha Committee members. He has renovated over 20 ancient pagodas and donated new Hti (umbrella crowns) around the country. He has also founded 10 monasteries and 6 Monastic Education Schools in Kayin State in order to create a wider access to education for the children in rural areas and build an educated society.

Since 1993, Sayadaw has engaged in Karen Peace Council (KPC) as a leading peace negotiator for the peace in Kayin State. He has also served as a patron for the Myanmar Peace Foundation. In 2001, he established a social group called Phlon Education Development Unit (PEDU) and began extensive social and local development works in Kayin State. In 1996, he opened a monastic school for children from kindergarten through tenth grade.  He also founded First Aid Groups in partnership with Myanmar Red Cross and initiated the establishment of the orthopedic rehabilitation center in Hpa-an township. On 10 September 2017, a completion ceremony for midwives training was held at the Taung Kalay Monastic School. Sayadaw also awards scholarships to outstanding students. He set up Nat Say Taman Scholarship Funds and provides financial assistance to students in Kayin State while serving as a patron for Karen Student Center (KSC), a boarding school for students from remote villages that lacks access to education. In 2009, he went to Australia and established Karen Melbourne Buddhist Association to promote Buddhism and provide spiritual counseling based on Buddha teaching to Karen community there. He was officially awarded honorary titles of Thaddhama Jotika Dhaja in 1991 and Maha Thaddhama Jotika Dhaja in 2001 by the government of Myanmar. In 2002, Sayadaw also received the Buddhist Literature Award from Japan.

Due to his influential impact on the local community, he is frequently visited by politicians, government officials, Karen leaders, KNU officers and many other local leaders. It is also reported that Taung Galay Sayadaw sent condolences to the passing of Padoh Saw David Taw who was the secretary of the KNU Peace Committee and also a member of a KNU delegation that negotiated peace with the Burmese government in January 2012.

Activities abroad
The Venerable Sayadaw has traveled extensively. He has traveled to India, Nepal and Sri Lanka in 1994, Thailand and Singapore in 1997, Japan in 2000, Australia in 2009 and America in 2015, and conducted Dhamma talk with Myanmar community in those countries as well as to citizens of those countries. His remarkable works for humanity have greatly inspired thousands of people to lead a good life and make differences in their community and country.
With the motto of “Toward the peaceful state of nirvana” the Venerable Sayadaw Ashin Pin Nya Tha Mi continues to write books and articles while practicing and teaching meditation.

References 

Theravada Buddhist monks
1960 births
Living people
Recipients of the Thiri Pyanchi